Ulmecatl (from Nahuatl, 'where the rubber is born') is one of the six giants sons of Mixcoatl and Tlaltecuhtli that populated the Earth after the Great Flood during the Fifth Sun in Aztec Mythology. The third son who founded Cuetlachoapan, the place where Puebla is now, in addition to Tontonihuacan and Huitzilapan.

References 

Aztec legendary creatures
Native American giants